The Spangle Maker is an EP by Scottish band Cocteau Twins, released on 4AD in April 1984. It was the first recording to be issued after bassist Simon Raymonde joined the band. The EP featured two versions of "Pearly-Dewdrops' Drops", and two B-sides. All three songs appeared in the band's live set.

"The Spangle Maker" and "Pepper-Tree" were recorded at the Palladium Studios in Edinburgh and mixed at Rooster in West London. "Pearly-Dewdrops' Drops" was recorded at Rooster.

Reception 
Ned Raggett of The Guardian wrote that "The Spangle Maker" had "a minimal, tense arrangement that suddenly exploded into a concluding, crashing swoon" and described "Pepper-Tree" as one of the band's "gentlest tracks to date, a serene and exquisite lope that could only be described as sunlight through curtains." He also remarked that "Pearly-Dewdrops' Drops" sounded like an anthem, featuring "Guthrie’s trademark sound of heavily reverbed guitars that might as well have been bells, that might as well have been keyboards," a slow pace, strong beats and Fraser's "soaring" vocals.

Track listing 
All songs written by Elizabeth Fraser, Robin Guthrie and Simon Raymonde.

12": 4AD / BAD 405 (UK) 
"The Spangle Maker" – 4:40
"Pearly-Dewdrops' Drops" – 5:13
"Pepper-Tree" – 3:57

7": 4AD / AD 405 (UK) 
"Pearly-Dewdrops' Drops" (7-inch version) – 4:11
"Pepper-Tree" – 3:57

CD: 4AD / BAD 405 CD (UK) 
"The Spangle Maker" – 4:40
"Pearly-Dewdrops' Drops" (12-inch version) – 5:13
"Pepper-Tree" – 3:57
"Pearly-Dewdrops' Drops" (7-inch version) – 4:11

 CD version released in 1991

Personnel 
Elizabeth Fraser – vocals
Robin Guthrie – guitar
Simon Raymonde – bass guitar

Additional personnel 
John Madden – recording engineer ("Pearly-Dewdrops' Drops"), mixing engineer
Jon Turner – recording engineer ("The Spangle Maker", "Pepper-Tree")

References

External links
 "The Spangle Maker" at discogs.com

Cocteau Twins albums
1984 EPs